Second Ward can refer to:

2nd Ward of New Orleans, a ward of New Orleans
Second Ward, Charlotte, a ward of Charlotte, North Carolina
Second Ward, Houston, a neighborhood of Houston
Ward 2 of the District of Columbia, a ward of Washington, D.C.
Ward 2, St. Louis City, an aldermanic ward of St. Louis
Ward 2, the name of several wards of Zimbabwe
Innes Ward, Ottawa (also known as Ward 2)